Gordon Taylor may refer to:

 Gordon Taylor (politician) (1910–2003), Canadian politician, businessman and teacher
 Gordon Taylor (Royal Navy chaplain) (1915–2009), Royal Navy chaplain, Anglican priest, author and clergyman
 Gordon Taylor (footballer) (born 1944), English former footballer
 Gordon Rattray Taylor (1911–1981), British author and journalist
 Gordon Taylor (aviator) (1896-1966), Australian aviator and author